Coleonema pulchellum, commonly known as confetti bush, buchu, diosma or  breath of heaven, is a shrub which is endemic to South Africa.

Description

It forms a single stem at the base, from where numerous thin and erect branches grow. The aromatic leaves are like needles and are 4 to 5 times longer (8-10 mm) than they are wide (0.8 mm). The petiole is 1 mm long.

The flowers are solitary, terminal in short axillary twigs or in small twigs, often dense towards the top of the branches. They are pink, often white, and star-shaped (7 to 8 mm in diameter), with 5 oval petals, 5.0-5.7 mm long, each marked with a distinctive central vein. The entire shrub will be covered in pink flowers from May to October, attracting bees, butterflies and other insects. The fruit is made up of a 5-chamber capsule, dotted with glands. There is a shiny black seed in each chamber.

Taxonomy
The species was formally described in 1981 in the Journal of South African Botany. Prior to this, plants in cultivation had been erroneously identified as Coleonema pulchrum.

The species is naturalised in Victoria, Australia.

Cultivars
 'Compactum' ('Nanum') — dwarf pink flowering form growing to 1m
'Rubrum' ('Red Form') — red flowering form
'Sunset Gold' — dwarf form with golden foliage to 75 cm high 
''Album' — white flowering variant

References

Flora of South Africa
Garden plants of Southern Africa
Zanthoxyloideae